The Central District of Bandar Abbas County is a district (bakhsh) in Bandar Abbas County, Hormozgan Province, Iran. At the 2006 census, its population was 429,093, in 103,540 families.  The District has two cities: Bandar Abbas & Tazian-e Pain. The District has three rural districts (dehestan): Gachin Rural District, Isin Rural District, and Tazian Rural District.

References 

Districts of Hormozgan Province
Bandar Abbas County